The Unió Korfbalera Sant Adrià de Besòs (UKSA) is the korfbal team of Sant Adrià de Besòs city. Nowadays, it is a member of the Catalan League of Korfbal, and the club's president is Pilar Arnalda Piñol. The UKSA is one of the oldest clubs of Catalonia, being a member of the Catalan Federation of Korfbal. The T-shirt colour is purple (the colour of the city) and the trousers and the skirt are black.

History

Founded on 28 February 2001 in the IES Manuel Vázquez Montalbán (Sant Adrià de Besòs high school), by the gymnastics teacher, Núria Riera, and a group of students of the same center; the club's first match was played on 21 April 2001 in the sport complex called Marina-Besòs.

The club's name comes from the name that the high school's doorman used to call the first korfball players of the center ("korfbalers") and also of the fact that among that group of founding students there was not only boys and girls from Sant Adrià de Besòs, but also from Badalona ("union"). Since then the team has taken part year behind year in official contests. At the beginning in low categories and afterwards in Second Division, where the club is at present.

At the moment the UKSA continues in its purpose of participating in the city life thanks to sport and the values that it transmits. In this line, the different activities and tournaments carried out in high schools and schools of the city have given a knowledge of korfball and of the club among the adrianencs, which has turned into an increasing influx to the senior team matches and into the creation of several groups of boys and girls in low categories.

Seasons

Senior

Until 2007 the club was in the Second Division for 5 seasons

2002 - 2003 - Sixth position
2003 - 2004 - Eighth position
2004 - 2005 - Seventh position
2005 - 2006 - Sixth position
2006 - 2007 - Tenth position

Junior

Until 2007 the club took part in the First Division for 2 seasons

2001 - 2002 - Champion
2002 - 2003 - Fifth position

Honours

2002 - Champion of Lliga Júnior
2004 - Fair-Play Segona Divisió
2005 - Third classified I Tournament of Korfbal Ciutat de Sant Adrià
2006 - Second classified II Torneig de Korfbal Ciutat de Sant Adrià

Presidents

2001 - Núria Riera i Bosch
2007 - Pilar Arnalda Piñol

External links
Official website

Sant Adrià de Besòs
Korfball teams in Catalonia
Korfball teams